Leopold Münster (13 December 1920 – 8 May 1944) was a German Luftwaffe military aviator and fighter ace during World War II. He is credited with 95 aerial victories achieved in over 500 combat missions. This figure includes 70 aerial victories on the Eastern Front, and further 25 victories over the Western Allies, including eight four-engined bombers.

Born in Pohorsch, Münster grew up in the First Czechoslovak Republic. Following the German occupation of Czechoslovakia, he joined the Luftwaffe in January 1939. Following flight training, Münster was posted to Jagdgeschwader 3 (JG 3—3rd Fighter Wing) in March 1941. Flying with this wing, he claimed his first aerial victory on 6 July 1941 on the Eastern Front during Operation Barbarossa. Following his 51st aerial victory, Münster was awarded the Knight's Cross of the Iron Cross on 21 December 1942. In October 1943, he and his unit were transferred to the Western Front fighting in Defense of the Reich. He was then appointed Staffelkapitän (squadron leader) of the 5. Staffel (5th squadron) of JG 3. Münster was killed in a mid-air collision with a Consolidated B-24 Liberator bomber on 8 May 1944. Posthumously, he was awarded the Knight's Cross of the Iron Cross with Oak Leaves on 12 May 1944.

Early life and career
Münster was born on 13 December 1920 in Pohorsch-Hochheim bei Odrau in the Sudetenland region of the First Czechoslovak Republic (present-day Pohoř, a part of Odry in the Czech Republic). His father was a construction foreman and farmer, his mother died when he was three years old. In 1926, Münster attended the Volksschule, a combined primary and lower secondary school, in Hochheim. In 1931, he transferred to the Bürgerschule, a school preparing pupils for a vocational education. He graduated in 1935 and then learned the trade of a house painter and decorator as well as sign painter. In parallel, he attended the vocational school in Mährisch-Ostrau, present-day Ostrava. As a child, he was a member of the sudetendeutsche Jugendbewegung (Sudeten German youth movement).

Following the German occupation of Czechoslovakia in October 1938, Münster volunteered for military service and joined the Luftwaffe on 7 January 1939. Following his recruit training with Fliegerausbildungsregiment 43 (43rd Flight Training Regiment) at Ingolstadt, he was posted to the airfield staff at Leipheim on 1 April. After he had passed his flight aptitude test, he was transferred to flight school at Crailsheim on 1 June. There, he was trained as a pilot which he completed in June 1940. Münster was promoted to Gefreiter (Lance Corporal) on 1 October 1940. In July 1940, Münster was transferred to the advanced Flugzeugführerschule C (FFS C—advanced flight school) at Burg bei Magdeburg where he received further theoretical training. On 1 October, he was promoted to Unteroffizier (sergeant) and transferred to the 3. Staffel (3rd squadron) of Jagdfliegerschule 3, the fighter pilot school at Fürth.

World War II
World War II in Europe had begun on Friday, 1 September 1939, when German forces invaded Poland. Münster completed his fighter pilot training in March 1941 and then flew some missions in Defense of the Reich from Fürth and Zerbst. On 18 March, he was posted to the 2. Staffel of Ergänzungsgruppe of Jagdgeschwader 3 (JG 3—3rd Fighter Wing). The Ergänzungsgruppe was a supplementary training group attached to JG 3 under the command of Major Alfred Müller with 2. (Schul—training) Staffel headed by Oberleutnant Erwin Neuerburg. On 1 June, Münster was transferred to the 4. Staffel of JG 3. This Staffel was commanded by Hauptmann Gordon Gollob and subordinated to II. Gruppe of JG 3 led by Hauptmann Lothar Keller.

Operation Barbarossa

In preparation for Operation Barbarossa, the German invasion of the Soviet Union, II. Gruppe headed east on 18 June. Following a stopover at Kraków, the unit was moved to Hostynne. At the start of the campaign, JG 3 under the command of Major (Major) Günther Lützow was subordinated to the V. Fliegerkorps (5th Air Corps), under the command of General der Flieger (General of the Aviators) Robert Ritter von Greim, itself part of Luftflotte 4 (4th Air Fleet), under the command of Generaloberst (Colonel General) Alexander Löhr. These air elements supported Generalfeldmarschall (Field Marshal) Gerd von Rundstedt's Army Group South, with the objective of capturing Ukraine and its capital Kiev. At 17:00 on 21 June 1941, the 5th Air Corps, based at Lipsko, briefed the various unit commanders of the upcoming attack. That evening, Gruppenkommandeur (group commander) of II. Gruppe Keller informed his subordinates of the attack.

The invasion of the Soviet Union began on 22 June 1941. II. Gruppe flew its first missions on the Eastern Front shortly before 04:00, flying low attacks against Soviet airfields in the vicinity of Lvov in Ukraine. At 06:30 the Gruppe fought its first aerial battles. In the beginning of July 1941, the front in the vicinity of the northern sector of Army Group South became increasingly fluid. This necessitated the relocation of II. Gruppe to Volodymyr-Volynskyi. The rapid advance of German ground forces required II. Gruppe to move to Lutsk on 5 July and then to Dubno that evening. The following day, II. Gruppe flew combat air patrols over Berdychiv and Zhytomyr. On one of these missions, Münster claimed his first aerial victory over a ZKB-19, referring to an Ilyushin DB-3 bomber. On 9 July, he was credited with the destruction of two further DB-3 bombers. Münster received the Iron Cross 2nd Class on 24 July 1941 and the Iron Cross 1st Class on 7 September 1941.

Following his ninth aerial victory claimed and 86 combat missions flown, Münster was transferred to the Stab (headquarters unit) of II. Gruppe. There, he increased his total of aerial victories claimed to twelve. Additionally he was credited with five ground victories and the destruction of a locomotive, increasing his number of combat missions flown to 124. On 31 October 1941, II. Gruppe flew its last combat mission over the northern Crimean combat zone and was ordered to retreat to Germany for a period of rest and refurbishment. On 1 December 1941, JG 3 was given the honorary name "Udet" following the suicide of World War I fighter pilot and Luftwaffe Generalleutnant Ernst Udet. Münster was awarded the Front Flying Clasp of the Luftwaffe in Gold on 16 December 1941.

Mediterranean Theatre
At Wiesbaden-Erbenheim airfield, II. Gruppe was equipped with Messerschmitt Bf 109 F-4 trop as the unit was to be deployed in the Mediterranean Theatre. After almost two months of rest, II. Gruppe was ordered to transfer to Sicily in early January 1942. Münster claimed one aerial victory in this theatre of operations. On 22 February, II. That day, Münster claimed a Hawker Hurricane shot down over Malta. II. Gruppe flew its last combat mission over Malta on 25 April 1942. On 27 April, II. Gruppe arrived at Plzeň where it was placed under the command of Hauptmann (Captain) Kurt Brändle.

Eastern Front
After three weeks of rest, II. Gruppe was moved to the southern sector of the Eastern Front and placed under control of VIII. Fliegerkorps (8th Air Corps) on the left wing of Army Group South. During this period, Münster was promoted to Feldwebel (platoon sergeant) on 1 April. Based at Chuhuiv, the Gruppe participated in the Second Battle of Kharkov, the Soviet attempt to retake the city. On 20 May, Münster claimed two aerial victories, a Mikoyan-Gurevich MiG-1 fighter and an Ilyushin Il-2 ground-attack aircraft. During this engagement, he was wounded in the upper leg resulting in the presentation of the Wound Badge in Black on 26 May.

On 21 July, II. Gruppe moved to an airfield at Novy Cholan located south of Tatsinskaya. In the following days, the Gruppe fought in the Battle of Kalach, supporting the German crossing of the Don. On 24 July, Münster became an "ace-in-a-day" when he shot down five Il-2 ground-attack aircraft and a Hurricane fighter, taking his total to 30 aerial victories claimed. From 21 November 1942 to March 1943, Münster was first hospitalized in Troppau, present-day Opava, where he received surgery and then spent some time convalescing. During this period, he was awarded the Knight's Cross of the Iron Cross (Ritterkreuz des Eisernen Kreuzes) on 21 December 1942 and promoted to Leutnant (second lieutenant). At the time, he had flown 322 combat missions and had claimed 51 aerial victories.

Defense of the Reich
The increasing daytime attacks of the United States Army Air Forces (USAAF) Eighth Air Force against targets in western Europe forced the Luftwaffe to transfer more and more fighter units from the Eastern Front back to Germany in Defense of the Reich. On 3 August 1943, II. Gruppes air elements arrived at Uetersen Airfield in northern Germany. Münster was appointed Staffelkapitän (squadron leader) of 5. Staffel of JG 3 on 20 October 1943. He succeeded Hauptmann Heinrich Sannemann who was transferred.

Münster claimed his first aerial victory over the USAAF on 13 November. That day, the Eighth Air Force targeted Bremen and Münster was credited with shooting down a Boeing B-17 Flying Fortress bomber. On 24 April 1944, Münster was temporarily put in command of II. Gruppe after its former commander Hauptmann Hermann Freiherr von Kap-herr was killed in action. Münster surrendered command to Hauptmann Gustav Frielinghaus at Gardelegen Airfield on 1 May. Since Frielinghaus was still convalescing from injuries sustained in December 1943, Frielinghaus led the Gruppe from the ground while Münster continued to lead in the air.

On 8 May, Münster was killed in a mid-air collision with a Consolidated B-24 Liberator bomber, possibly from the 445th Bombardment Group. Münster was replaced by Leutnant Hans Grünberg as commander of 5. Staffel. Münster was posthumously awarded the 471st Knight's Cross of the Iron Cross with Oak Leaves (Ritterkreuz des Eisernen Kreuzes mit Eichenlaub) on 12 May 1944. On 20 May, he was given a military funeral in his hometown Pohorsch.

Summary of career

Aerial victory claims
According to US historian David T. Zabecki, Münster was credited with 95 aerial victories. Spick also lists Münster with 95 aerial victories claimed in an unknown number of combat missions. This figure includes 70 aerial victories on the Eastern Front, and further 25 victories over the Western Allies, including eight heavy bombers. According to Obermaier, Münster flew over 500 combat missions. Mathews and Foreman, authors of Luftwaffe Aces — Biographies and Victory Claims, researched the German Federal Archives and found records for 86 aerial victory claims, plus six further unconfirmed claims. This figure includes 72 aerial victories on the Eastern Front and 14 over the Western Allies, including 10 heavy bombers.

Victory claims were logged to a map-reference (PQ = Planquadrat), for example "PQ 39411". These sectors were then subdivided into 36 smaller units to give a location area 3 × 4 km in size.

Awards
 Iron Cross (1939)
 2nd Class (24 July 1941)
 1st Class (7 September 1941)
 Front Flying Clasp of the Luftwaffe for Fighter Pilots in Gold (16 December 1941)
 Wound Badge in Black (26 May 1942)
 Honour Goblet of the Luftwaffe on 13 September 1942 as Feldwebel and pilot
 German Cross in Gold on 3 October 1942 as Feldwebel in the 4./Jagdgeschwader 3
 Knight's Cross of the Iron Cross with Oak Leaves
 Knight's Cross on 21 December 1942 as Feldwebel and pilot in the II./Jagdgeschwader 3 "Udet"
 471st Oak Leaves on 12 May 1944 as Leutnant (war officer) and Staffelkapitän of the 4./Jagdgeschwader 3 "Udet"

Notes

References

Citations

Bibliography

 
 
 
 
 
 
 
 
 
 
 
 
 
 
 
 
 
 
 
 
 

1920 births
1944 deaths
Luftwaffe pilots
German World War II flying aces
Recipients of the Gold German Cross
Recipients of the Knight's Cross of the Iron Cross with Oak Leaves
Luftwaffe personnel killed in World War II
Aviators killed by being shot down
People from Nový Jičín District
Moravian-German people
Sudeten German people